Red Express, sub titled The Trans-Siberian Railroad, is a 1991 TV documentary following the Trans Siberian railway. It was part of ABC's World of Discovery series. It was written and produced by Hugh Piper and narrated by Ron Perlman.

A soundtrack album, composed and performed by Jan Castor, was nominated for the 1992 ARIA Award for Best Original Soundtrack, Cast or Show Album.

References

Soundtracks by Australian artists
1991 soundtrack albums